Sean Malto (born September 9, 1989) is an American professional skateboarder.

Early life
Malto is from Lansing, Kansas. He is of Euro-American and Filipino descent. Malto started skateboarding at the age of 10 at the hands of the inspiration of his older brothers Travis, Justin and Chris . He explained in a 2013 video segment for the Skullcandy brand that the Escapist Skate Shop in Kansas City supported his skateboarding from an early age and has never ceased in this role.

Professional skateboarding
Malto's first skateboard deck sponsor was Girl Skateboards and, as of April 2018, he continues to be sponsored by the company. Malto's part in the 2012 Girl/Chocolate video Pretty Sweet was remixed by Girl and Ed Banger Records. Nearly ten minutes in length, the remixed part is edited to the Justice song "Brian Vision MMXIII" and "Secam" by Mr. Oizo.

At the finals of the Kansas City stop of the 2013 SLS competition, one of Malto's skateboarding trucks dismantled during the performance of a trick and he was subsequently eliminated as a contender.

In November 2013, Malto suffered an extreme ankle injury that sidelined him from the professional skateboarding circuit for almost 3 years. An in depth documentary on his recovery was uploaded to YouTube in 2016. Malto's first video part since his return is 'Nike SB: Elite Squad' part which was uploaded to YouTube, the Berrics, and the Nike SB website.

Sponsors
As of 2017, Sean Malto's sponsors are Girl, Nike SB, Spitfire Wheels, Thunder Trucks, Beats by Dre, Diamond Supply Co., Escapist Skateboarding, Bones Bearings, Grizzly Griptape, GoPro and Mountain Dew.

Awards 
Won: Transworld Skateboarding Magazine 2009 "Rookie of the Year"
Nominated: Transworld Skateboarding Magazine 2010 "Reader's Choice"

Business of Sean Malto
Founded by Australian surfer Josh Kerr and professional US skateboarders Mikey Taylor and Paul Rodriguez, the Saint Archer Brewing Co. is a microbrewery that is co-owned by the brand's "Ambassadors," including Malto. The team of Ambassadors includes professional skateboarders Eric Koston, Brian "Slash" Hansen, and Bryan Herman; professional and non-professional surfers Taylor Knox, Dusty Payne, Laura Enever, and Jeff Johnson; former professional snowboarder Todd Richards; photographer Atiba Jefferson; and surfboard shaper Chris Christenson.

Contest results
 2010 Cph Pro - 1st
 2011 Street League Skateboarding Championships - Won
 2013 Cph Pro - 3rd
2013 X Games Foz do Iguacu - 2nd

Videography
Rough Copy 
Through Being Nice 
Escapist: Fourteen Deep
Etnies: Sangria Nights
Transworld: And Now
Street Dreams
Gatorade: Go All Day with Chaz Ortiz
Escapist: Red and Yellow (2012)
Girl/AntiHero: Beauty and the Beast (1 and 3)
Girl: Outbackwards
Girl: Yanks on Planks
Girl/Chocolate: Badass Meets Dumbass
Girl: Yes We CANada
Fourstar: We're OK EurOK
Fourstar: Gang of Fourstar
Fourstar: A Tribe Called Mapquest
Etnies: Arizona (2009)
Etnies: Etnies in Japan
Etnies: Barcelona (2008)
Etnies: Bratwurst Jam
Transworld: Skate and Create (2009 and 2010).
Girl and Chocolate: Der Bratwurst Tour Ever
Girl/Chocolate: Pretty Sweet (2012)
Chiefs Kingdom: Sean Malto (2013)
Greenlabel: We Are Blood
Nike Skateboarding: "Elite Squad" (2017)Chocolate Chip (2017) Doll (2018) 
Nike Skateboarding: "Trust Fall" (2019)
Nike Skateboarding: "Constant" (2021)

Video game appearances
Malto is a playable character in the 2010 video game Tony Hawk: Shred''.

References

External links 
Official Website
YouTube - Sean Malto
ESPN - The Age of Malto by Adam Salo

Living people
American skateboarders
American sportspeople of Filipino descent
1989 births
Sportspeople from Leavenworth, Kansas